Alexssander Medeiros de Azeredo, commonly known as Alex, is a Brazilian professional footballer who plays for Al-Arabi as a striker.

Club career
From 2010 to 2013 he played for Botafogo where he managed to make 33 appearances, scoring 6 goals, in three years. During this period he has played on loan even for Joinville and for Dibba Club in the United Arab Emirates, moving abroad for the first time. In 2014 had another short spell with Joinville, this time not on loan.
Alex then enjoyed shorter stints at Khaleej FC in Saudi Arabia and Army United in Thailand.

On 1 January 2016, it was reported that he had signed for Brazilian club Resende Futebol Clube, immediately being loaned out to Swedish side Hammarby IF until the end of the season. But in April the same year, it was revealed that Hammarby initially had signed the player outright on a one-year contract.

After a promising start to the 2016 season with Hammarby, Alex failed to make an impact during the second half of the campaign. He left the club by mutual consent in early November the same year, after making 28 appearances in the league play and contributing with 5 goals.

Alex signed with Danish club Silkeborg IF on 14 June 2017. He left the club again at the end of 2018. He then joined Bangu in his home country.

References

External links

1990 births
Living people
People from São Gonçalo, Rio de Janeiro
Brazilian footballers
Association football forwards
Botafogo de Futebol e Regatas players
Joinville Esporte Clube players
Dibba FC players
Khor Fakkan Sports Club players
Al Bataeh Club players
Al-Arabi SC (UAE) players
Army United F.C. players
Hammarby Fotboll players
Silkeborg IF players
Bangu Atlético Clube players
Associação Atlética Portuguesa (RJ) players
Campeonato Brasileiro Série A players
Campeonato Brasileiro Série B players
Campeonato Brasileiro Série D players
Thai League 1 players
UAE First Division League players
UAE Pro League players
Ascenso MX players
Allsvenskan players
Danish Superliga players
Danish 1st Division players
Brazilian expatriate footballers
Brazilian expatriate sportspeople in the United Arab Emirates
Brazilian expatriate sportspeople in Thailand
Brazilian expatriate sportspeople in Sweden
Brazilian expatriate sportspeople in Denmark
Expatriate footballers in the United Arab Emirates
Expatriate footballers in Thailand
Expatriate footballers in Sweden
Expatriate men's footballers in Denmark
Sportspeople from Rio de Janeiro (state)